"Lucky Star" is a 1961 song by Dave Burgess, first recorded as a B-side by Ricky Nelson but better known in the A-side version by Gene Vincent.

The tune was written by Dave Burgess of the Champs, an old friend of Vincent's who now ran Five Star Music and Challenge Records. It is no relation to "Lucky Star" the 1957 song by Marvin Rainwater. The lyrics commence as follows:

Lucky star shine on me, Lucky star don't you see, I need your light shinin' bright, To win her love for me tonight..

Ricky Nelson version
The song was first recorded by Ricky Nelson who had covered several of Dave Burgess' songs from 1957 onwards, with Burgess philosophical about the more commercial success Nelson had with his own songs than himself.

Gene Vincent version
Vincent's version of Burgess' song occurred after Vincent was forced to cancel the remainder of a UK tour after collapsing in Glasgow and then, after two days in the Glasgow Royal Infirmary, collapsing again in Rumford and being flown home. Vincent's first return to work after this incident was a low-pressure session in October 1961 at the Capitol studios in Hollywood with Burgess and his band. Dave Burgess was an old friend, who was in The Champs when they'd toured with the Blue Caps. Lucky Star and the B-Side – a cover version of Clyde Pitts' "Baby Don't Believe Him", which Pitts also released in 1961 – were the result of the session. The track was released as a single in the fifth week of November 1961. It was his last USA Capitol single. In March 1962 Vincent was back in the UK touring with Brenda Lee and included the new song "Lucky Star" in a set consisting mainly of older hits. The song has been reissued on several compilation albums including A Portrait of Gene Vincent and Gene Vincent's 20 Greatest.  Coincidentally Vincent was the first American to appear on the show Thank Your Lucky Stars.

References

Gene Vincent songs
1961 songs
1961 singles
Capitol Records singles